Gain Glacier is a large glacier on the east coast of Palmer Land, Antarctica, flowing northeast from Cat Ridge and entering the Weddell Sea between Imshaug Peninsula and Morency Island. It was mapped by the United States Geological Survey in 1974, and was named by the Advisory Committee on Antarctic Names for Louis Gain, a naturalist on the French Antarctic Expedition, 1908–10, and the author of several of the expedition reports on zoology and botany.

See also
 List of glaciers in the Antarctic
 Glaciology

References

Glaciers of Palmer Land